, also known as Venus to Mamoru, is a Japanese light novel series written by Hiroki Iwata and illustrated by Toshiyuki Satō following Mamoru Yoshimura and his far-from-normal high school life with girlfriend Ayako Takasu, who possess magical powers called "Beatrice".

The series was first published on September 25, 2003 by MediaWorks. An anime television series adaptation animated by Zexcs was broadcast on Wowow from October 6, 2006, to March 30, 2007, airing 24 episodes.

Plot
Mamoru-kun ni Megami no Shukufuku wo! centers around Mamoru Yoshimura, a high school student who gets accepted into a prestigious school for students endowed with the power of Beatrice due to his high intellect. Right after first entering the school on his first day, he meets the mysterious Ayako Takasu, also known as the Beatrice's Angel of Death, who is a pretty and popular female student whose powers exceed most others. Moments later, Ayako, who has never been known to show a smile, suddenly confesses her strong feelings for Mamoru, despite having never met him before. That same day, he is brought in as a member of the student council as Ayako's side as he becomes involved with the dangers and mysteries related to the power of Beatrice.

Characters

Student council members

Mamoru is a petit 16-year-old high school student with a beguiling smile who transfers to the prestigious Beatrice Academy due to his high intellect and high aptitude for Beatrice, which is revealed to be seventh highest in the history of the school. On his first day at school, he not only becomes a member of the student council, but also the boyfriend of fellow student council member, Ayako Takasu, who confessed her love for him earlier that day. He is a soft spoken character who is unsure of why Ayako would like someone like him. He officially becomes Ayako's boyfriend after they defeat an enemy together. Mamoru can't seem to say no to the student council and ends up involved in their zany schemes because of it. He is fascinated with Beatrice because when he was younger he was trapped by a disaster and rescued by a man using Beatrice who turns out to have been Ayako's uncle who, along with Ayako, had been trapped along with Mamoru and numerous other people.

Ayako is a very beautiful and well-endowed second year high school girl. She is one of the most powerful Beatrice users in the world, which is why she is sometimes targeted by assassins. Usually, Ayako is a very serious girl, who has never been known to smile around others. However, whenever she is around Mamoru, she can't help but blush and smile a little. Ayako ends up being Mamoru's girlfriend after their first fight with an enemy. Ayako's parents thought of her as a freak and abandoned her. She grew up living alone with a caretaker in her grandfather's mansion, which may help to explain her asocial personality prior to meeting Mamoru.

Maya is the student council president who has a strong character, which complements his status. He often does things that irritate Ayako to the point of earning a heavy punch from her. While browsing through Maya's picture album, Mamoru realizes that all of Maya's ex-girlfriends have long hair, and seems to realize that Maya has a crush on Ayako, who also has long hair.

Shione is the vice president of the student council and Maya's younger sister. She often has a very extravagant hairstyle, which changes everyday, that even her own brother calls "complicated". Everyone became so used to her wacky hairstyles that they do not recognize her when she had her hair down. Maya was overjoyed to realize that he had such a cute little sister.

Mitsuki is the public relations officer of the student council. She always has a camera with her and takes many pictures of whatever is going on around her. Her favourite subject is Ayako; she sells these for outrageous prices. Beside pictures of Ayako, Mitsuki also takes pictures of the student council as Ayako punishes then for their latest scheme.

Anna is the secretary of the student council. She seems to be the most "normal" of all the student council officers.

Yōko is the treasurer of the student council. She is very level-headed and confident, and is the tallest among the girls.

Yūka is the science officer of the student council. She is very shy and soft spoken, and owns a pet dog named Al
.

Kōsuke is the executive committee member of the student council. He is very tall and muscular, well versed in using weapons, and has a major quirk of speaking in English (he even sings a tune in English in one episode).

Others

She's Mamoru younger sister who, apparently, has a big "Brother Complex", although it seems to over come it through the series. She has also been the cook in the house since she was little because their mother isn't good at it.

Emelenzia is a Beatrice user, and a genius who entered university at the age of twelve. She was an orphan until the Rudiger family acknowledged her potential and now aims to be strong enough to support her older brother, Johan, for whom she has the utmost respect. Emelenzia also admires Ayako since she was able to stand toe-to-toe with her brother in battle. On her brother's orders she tries to seduce Mamoru after she transfers so as to separate him from Ayako. Her efforts fail and she develops a crush on Mamoru. Later in the anime her feelings grow much stronger, to the point that she confesses even though Ayako is present.

A German university student, who is called the Prussian Devil. He is one of the most powerful Beatrice users in the world. In their battle Ayako was seriously injured, while Johan barely had a scratch on him. Despite this it was called a draw. Because Ayako is capable of fighting against him on equal footing, he aims to have Ayako as his bride, as he considers no one else, especially not Mamoru, worthy of her. Besides his outstanding Beatrice control, Johan is also very intelligent and is investigating the origins of Beatrice with Ayako's uncle.

Tsuneo is a student in Mamoru's school who enthusiastically stalks Ayako. He is a very blatant in his obsession with Ayako and will stop at nothing to be close to her. He is revealed to be working with the Silver Maria for reasons unknown.
Maria

Also known as the Silver Maria. The discoverer of Beatrice and the world's most powerful Beatrist. She and Ayako's uncle have a history together that is not revealed. She has developed devices that prevent people from using Beatrice and opposes Johan Rudiger and Ayako's uncle's plans to create a sentient form of Beatrice.

Media

Light novels
Mamoru-kun ni Megami no Shukufuku wo! began as a light novel series written by Hiroki Iwata and illustrated by Toshiyuki Satō. It published from September 25, 2003 to March 25, 2009 in sixteen volumes, by MediaWorks.

Anime
An anime television series adaptation animated by Zexcs, written by Mari Okada, and directed by Itsuro Kawasaki aired in Japan on Wowow from October 6, 2006, to March 30, 2007, for a total of 24 episodes.

Episodes

Theme songs
Opening theme "MA·MO·RU!" by Maho Tomita
Ending theme "Venus Dream" by Hiromi Satou

References

 Maeda, Hisashi et al. "Mamoru-kun ni Megami no Shukufuku o!". Newtype USA 5 (11) 64–65. November 2006. .

External links
 

2003 Japanese novels
Anime and manga based on light novels
Dengeki Bunko
Kadokawa Dwango franchises
Light novels
Romantic comedy anime and manga
Television shows written by Mari Okada
Zexcs